Rollerites is a Jurassic ammonite belonging to the ammonitid.

Distribution 
France, Saudi Arabia and Switzerland

References
Notes

Jurassic ammonites